Richard van Poelgeest (born 23 March 1966) is a Dutch retired basketball player. He played for several clubs in the Netherlands and Belgium in his career. He was also a member of the Netherlands national basketball team.

Career
Van Poelgeest started his professional career in 1984 with Elmex Leiden in the Eredivisie, the highest league in the Netherlands.

Van Poelgeest played college basketball in the United States for the Nebraska Cornhuskers starting from 1986. His career high was 19 points against Iowa State on 26 February 1988.

After college, he returned to the Netherlands to play for BSW Weert, at the time named Selex Weert. In 1994, he won the club's first Dutch championship with Weert. He was also named the Most Valuable Player of the 1993–94 season.

From 1994 until 1996, Van Poelgeest played for Goba Gorinchem. With Goba, he won the NBB Cup in 1995.

For the last three years of his professional career, he returned to BSW Weert.

After, he played at a semi-professional level with Hasselt in the Belgian Second Division.

National team career
With the  national team, Van Poelgeest played at EuroBasket 1989.

References

External links
Eurobasket.com profile

1966 births
Living people
BSW (basketball club) players
Leuven Bears players
BC Oostende players
GOBA Gorinchem players
B.S. Leiden players
Dutch Basketball League players
Canadians basketball players
Goba Gorinchem players
Dutch men's basketball players
Centers (basketball)
People from Rijswijk